George Edward Wade (1853, London – 5 February 1933) was a British sculptor.  He was largely self-taught as an artist and is best remembered for his statues of royalty and politicians.

He was baptised on 17 April 1853 at Westminster, London, England. He was the son of the Rev. Canon Nugent Wade and Louisa Fenwick.

In 1929 Wade had two works dedicated in London, to Catherine and William Booth.  He was the first General of the Salvation Army and she was the "Army Mother." Mrs. Booth presents a "serene and matronly figure", while he is "an Old Testament figure with eyes ablaze, beard flowing, finger pointing, medals mustered, and a small prayer book in his hand."

Selected works
 Bust of Ignacy Jan Paderewski 1891

“500 copies of his likeness of the pianist Paderewski went out to America alone.
 Sir John A. Macdonald Memorial, Gore Park (Hamilton, Ontario) c. 1893
 The Macdonald Monument, Montreal, Quebec, Canada. 1895
 Queen Victoria, Colombo, Sri Lanka 1897
 Lady Henry Somerset Memorial, London,  1897 (stolen 1971 and replaced by a copy in 1991)
Another casting was placed in Portland, Maine, USA in 1917
 King Edward VII, statue in his coronation robes, Reading, Berkshire, unveiled November 1902.
 Three former statues of Statue Square, Hong Kong: Edward VII (1907), Queen Alexandra (1909), Mary of Teck, Princess of Wales and future Queen Mary (1909).
 Alexandra of Denmark, London, 1908
 Field Marshal Douglas Haig,  Edinburgh Castle, Edinburgh, 1923
 William Booth, London, 1929
 Catherine Booth, 1929

References

1853 births
1933 deaths
English sculptors
English male sculptors
20th-century British sculptors
19th-century British sculptors